Cyclophoroidea  is a superfamily of land snails with an operculum, terrestrial gastropods within the informal group Architaenioglossa, that belongs to the clade Caenogastropoda.

These terrestrial gastropods have lost the ctenidium (comb-like respiratory apparatus) and osphradium, and the pallial cavity has been modified as a lung.

Taxonomy 
According to the Taxonomy of the Gastropoda (Bouchet & Rocroi, 2005), this superfamily consists of the following families :
Family Aciculidae Gray, 1850
 Family Cochlostomatidae Kobelt, 1902
Family Craspedopomatidae Kobelt & Möllendorff, 1898
Family Cyclophoridae Gray, 1847
Subfamily Cyclophorinae Gray, 1847
 Tribe Caspicyclotini Wenz, 1938
 Tribe Cyathopomatini Kobelt & Möllendorff, 1897
 Tribe Cyclophorini Gray, 1847
 Tribe Cyclotini Pfeiffer, 1853
 Tribe Pterocyclini Kobelt & Möllendorff, 1897
Subfamily Alycaeinae Blanfoird, 1864
Subfamily Spirostomatinae Tielecke, 1940
Family Diplommatinidae Pfeiffer, 1857
Subfamily Diplommatininae Pfeiffer, 1857
 † Family Ferussinidae Wenz, 1923 (1915)
Family Maizaniidae Tielecke, 1940
Family Megalomastomatidae Blanford, 1864
Family Neocyclotidae Kobelt & Möllendorff, 1897
Subfamily Amphicyclotinae Kobelt & Möllendorff, 1897
Subfamily Neocyclotinae Kobelt & Möllendorff, 1897
Family Pupinidae Pfeiffer, 1853
Subfamily Liareinae Powell, 1946
Subfamily Pupinellinae Kobelt, 1902
Subfamily  Pupininae Pfeiffer, 1853
Families brought into synonymy
 Acmeidae Pollonera, 1905: synonym of Aciculidae Gray, 1850
 Alycaeidae Blanford, 1864: synonym of Cyclophoridae Gray, 1847
 Bolaniidae Wenz, 1915: synonym of Craspedopomatidae Kobelt & Möllendorff, 1898
 Dicristidae Golikov & Starobogatov, 1975: synonym of Neocyclotidae Kobelt & Möllendorff, 1897
 Lagocheilidae Stoliczka, 1872: synonym of Cyclophoroidea Gray, 1847
 † Strophostomatidae Wenz, 1915: synonym of † Ferussinidae Wenz, 1923 (1915)

References

 
Architaenioglossa
Taxa named by John Edward Gray